New State Ice Co. v. Liebmann, 285 U.S. 262 (1932), was a decision by the Supreme Court of the United States.

Facts
The New State Ice Company, which was properly licensed in by the Corporation Commission of Oklahoma, brought suit against Liebmann to prevent him from selling ice in Oklahoma City without a license. At that time, electric refrigerators were expensive; thus, most people used block ice for cooling food.

The lower courts had relied on Frost v. Corporation Commission  to conclude that a license is not necessary if existing businesses are "sufficient to meet the public needs therein."

Decision
The Supreme Court struck down the requirement that businesses selling ice obtain a license as violating the Due Process clause of the Constitution. The Court distinguished the case from Frost, which was concerned with businesses that grind grain. It found a public interest key to feeding the population that was not comparable to the ice market.

Justice Brandeis dissented from the court's opinion and was joined by Justice Stone:

See also
List of United States Supreme Court cases, volume 285
Laboratories of democracy, a concept in political theory that takes its name from Justice Brandeis' dissent

References

External links
 
 

1932 in United States case law
United States Supreme Court cases
United States Supreme Court cases of the Hughes Court
Ice trade
Ice companies